Flying Fish Point is a coastal town, locality and headland in the Cassowary Coast Region, Queensland, Australia.

Geography 
Flying Fish Point is on the northern shore of the mouth of the Johnstone River as it enters the Coral Sea.

History 

The town was originally called Musgrave, but on 1 December 1961 it was officially changed to Flying Fish Point. The town's name comes from the headland, which in turn was named by explorer George Elphinstone Dalrymple on 4 October 1873, after the twelve ton cutter Flying Fish which was the principal vessel of his North East Coast Expedition. The southern shore of the mouth of the Johnstone River, Coquette Point, was named after another cutter in the expedition. C

Thomas Henry Fitzgerald had successfully established sugarcane plantations in the Mackay area and in April 1880 came to Flying Fish Point and planted sugarcane there on 15 June 1880. The focus of his sugarcane interests shifted further up the Johnstone River resulting in the establishing of Geraldton (later Innisfail) as the major sugarcane growing area. Flying Fish Point with its sandy beach instead became a popular holiday town for the area.

The first Catholic mass was celebrated in Flying Fish Point on 1 January 1940 in Edwin Shaw's hut.

Flying Fish Point Provisional School opened on 23 January 1899. It closed on a number of occasions due to low student numbers. It also closed for a period in 1918 after the school building was destroyed in a cyclone in March 1918. The school also closed for a period in World War II from about February 1942 when people were evacuated from the district due to fears of a Japanese invasion but the school did not reopen until 1947. It is unclear when it became Flying Fish Point State School as it is today.

Education 
Flying Fish Point State School is a government co-educational primary (P-6) school on Maud Street. In 2016, the school had an enrolment of 56 students with 5 teachers (4 full-time equivalent) and 10 non-teaching staff (5 full-time equivalent).

Community groups 
The Flying Fish Point branch of the Queensland Country Women's Association meets at QCWA Hall on Alice Street.

Amenities 
The town is home to the Flying Fish Point Tourist Park and a cafe.

Gallery

References

External links 

 
 Town map of Flying Fish Point, 1984

Towns in Queensland
Cassowary Coast Region
Localities in Queensland